Sialkot is a city in Punjab, Pakistan.

Sialkot may also refer to:

Places 
Sialkot District, a district of Punjab (Pakistan)
Sialkot Tehsil, a tehsil of district Sialkot
Sialkot Fort, a fort in Pakistan
Sialkot Cantonment, a cantonment in Pakistan
Sialkot International Airport, an airport in Pakistan
Sialkot Junction railway station, a railway station in Pakistan
Sialkot, Khyber Pakhtunkhwa, a village in Khyber Pakhtunkhwa

See also
Sialkot cricket team, a local domestic team
Sialkot Stallions, a cricket team